Remo Pianezzi (27 February 1927 – 8 January 2015) was a Swiss professional racing cyclist. He rode in three editions of the Tour de France.

References

External links
 

1927 births
2015 deaths
Swiss male cyclists
Place of birth missing